John Marcus "Scoot" McNairy (born November 11, 1977) is an American actor and film producer. He is known for his roles in Monsters, Argo, Killing Them Softly, 12 Years a Slave, Gone Girl, and Batman v Superman: Dawn of Justice. In television, he starred in the AMC period drama Halt and Catch Fire, True Detective, Narcos: Mexico, and the Netflix western miniseries Godless.

Early life 
McNairy was born on November 11, 1977, in Dallas, Texas, to Alicia Ann McNairy (née Merchant) and Stewart Hall McNairy. In addition to a house in Dallas, the family had a ranch in rural Paris, Texas, where they spent time on weekends and holidays. Growing up, he did theater in after-school programs. His father began calling him Scooter when he was about two years old. "A lot of people are like, oh, it must be some amazing story. But it's because I used to scoot around on my butt," says McNairy.

McNairy has stated that he is "highly dyslexic" and that he had to "go to dyslexia school for four years." He describes himself as a visual learner and was attracted to films for that reason. McNairy attended Lake Highlands High School.

Career

Actor 
McNairy moved to Austin, Texas, when he was 18 to attend the University of Texas at Austin. In 2001 he appeared in Wrong Numbers, written and directed by Alex Holdridge, which won the Audience Award at the Austin Film Festival. Holdridge was hired to remake Wrong Numbers into a studio picture, which was never made. Interested in cinematography and photography, McNairy moved to Los Angeles to go to film school. He attended for a year, then dropped out and began working in film production, doing carpentry and building film sets. He then worked as an extra before eventually securing a consistent job in more than 200 TV commercials. He eventually was offered roles in feature films, a career he has been pursuing since 2001.

During the early 2000s, McNairy portrayed colorful and individualistic young men with a rebellious edge. He had small parts in films, including Wonderland, Herbie: Fully Loaded, and Art School Confidential. 2010 saw the release of the alien invader film Monsters by Gareth Edwards, in which McNairy starred and featured largely improvised dialogue and was shot in Mexico, Guatemala, Costa Rica, and Texas.

In 2012, McNairy played Frankie in director Andrew Dominik's film Killing Them Softly opposite Brad Pitt. This led to a string of high-profile roles, including Ben Affleck's Argo, Gus Van Sant's Promised Land, and Lynn Shelton's Touchy Feely opposite Rosemarie DeWitt. For his role as Joe Stafford in Argo, he studied Persian, which he spoke in his final monologue in the film. In 2013, he appeared in Steve McQueen's 12 Years a Slave, which again included Pitt. McNairy filmed his second movie with Michael Fassbender, Leonard Abrahamson's Frank, and co-starred in Jaume Collet-Serra's Non-Stop, opposite Liam Neeson and Julianne Moore.

He appears in David Michod's The Rover opposite Robert Pattinson and Guy Pearce. McNairy starred as computer engineer and internet pioneer Gordon Clark in the AMC Network drama Halt and Catch Fire, about the personal computer business in the 1980s and 1990s. The series ran for four seasons from 2013–2017 to high critical acclaim. By coincidence, his character's wife in Halt and Catch Fire is portrayed by actor Kerry Bishé, who also played his spouse in Argo. McNairy played Wallace Keefe in Batman v Superman: Dawn of Justice. In September 2016, McNairy was announced as a cast member in the third season of the FX drama Fargo.

In 2017, McNairy played crime boss Novak in the crime drama Sleepless and returned to television when he co-starred in the Netflix western-miniseries Godless as shortsighted sheriff Bill McNue. Since 2018, he has also portrayed DEA Agent Walt Breslin on Netflix's Narcos: Mexico. He received critical acclaim for his portrayal of troubled father Tom Purcell in the third season of True Detective in 2019.

McNairy next appeared in Taurus, alongside Machine Gun Kelly (who also co-wrote the script) and Megan Fox, which premiered at the 72nd Berlin International Film Festival. He also reunited with Andrew Dominik in the 2022 film Blonde, an adaptation of Joyce Carol Oates's historical fiction novel that chronicles the inner life of Marilyn Monroe. In 2022, McNairy also starred in the Netflix mystery film Luckiest Girl Alive and the live-action/animated hybrid musical comedy Lyle, Lyle, Crocodile. Additionally, he voiced a character in AMC's animated series Pantheon.

Upcoming projects
As of July 2022, McNairy is filming the drama The Line. He will star in the film Fairyland, which concluded production in June 2022. In February 2022, it was announced that McNairy would star alongside Michael Shannon, Emilia Clarke and Dane DeHaan in an upcoming Joseph McCarthy biopic. In May 2022, he reportedly joined Jack Reynor and Emily Browning in psychological thriller Brightwater. That same month, McNairy was announced as part of the cast for Blood for Dust, an action thriller, also including Kit Harington and Josh Lucas. A month later, McNairy also joined Amy Adams in Marielle Heller's Nightbitch. Filming is set to start in September 2022.

Producer 

McNairy worked as producer for 2007's In Search of a Midnight Kiss, in which he also starred and which is referred to as his breakout film. He has worked on a number of other projects as an actor and producer, including 2012's A Night in the Woods; and Angry White Man, Dragon Day, and The Off Hours, all released in 2011.

Other work 
 In 2002, McNairy appeared in the music video for Death Cab for Cutie's "A Movie Script Ending".
 In 2006, McNairy appeared in the music video for "Fidelity" by Regina Spektor, directed by McNairy's friend Marc Webb.
 In 2007, McNairy appeared in the BookShorts film for JPod by Douglas Coupland, incorrectly credited as "Scoot McNally".

Personal life 
McNairy married actress Whitney Able in 2010. They initially started dating in Los Angeles about six months before co-starring in Monsters. They have two children. On November 19, 2019, Able announced that they had divorced.

Filmography

Film

Television

Awards and nominations

References

External links 

 
 

1977 births
Living people
20th-century American male actors
21st-century American male actors
American male film actors
American male television actors
Film producers from Texas
Male actors from Dallas
Outstanding Performance by a Cast in a Motion Picture Screen Actors Guild Award winners
People from Paris, Texas
Actors with dyslexia
University of Texas at Austin alumni